Howard P. Carter Career Center was a high school in the Fifth Ward area of Houston, Texas. The school, serving grades 6 through 12, was a part of the Houston Independent School District. The school served as a vocational school and pregnant girls' school. Carter Career Center had many students who are single parents. It had a day-care center that is supported by corporations, the state, the federal government, and foundations. After the closure of Carter, the building housed the DeVry Advantage Academy.

History
The campus, built in 1913, originally housed McGowan Elementary School, a school for white children. On January 31, 1927 Wheatley High School first opened  at 3415 Lyons Avenue in the former McGowan Elementary School  building. In 1949 Wheatley moved into a new campus. E.O. Smith Education Center opened in the former Wheatley building in 1950. During the beginning of the 1979-1980 school year, E.O. Smith moved into its current facility. Carter Career Center opened in the McGowen/Wheatley/Smith former building.

In 2006, Kay On Going School's separate campus closed and the program moved into Carter Career Center. A $4.5 million addition, funded through a 2004 bond issue, was opened in August 2007. This included culinary classrooms, high-tech laboratories, and a nursing school.

References

External links

 

Defunct schools in the Houston Independent School District
Houston Independent School District high schools
Former high schools in Houston
Public high schools in Houston
Educational institutions disestablished in 2011
Buildings and structures completed in 1913
2011 establishments in Texas